Grandidier's free-tailed bat (Chaerephon leucogaster) is a species of bat in the family Molossidae. It is endemic to Madagascar.  Its natural habitats are subtropical or tropical dry forests and dry savanna. It has at times been considered synonymous with the little free-tailed bat.

Classical ring species hypothesis 
A ring species occurs when two populations that are connected by a geographic ring of populations that can interbreed but do not interbreed despite living in the same region. Upon migrating to the Comoros, Grandidier's free-tailed bat and C. pusillius became sympatric. There is evidence of isolation between the two populations further restricting gene flow.

References

Chaerephon (bat)
Bats of Africa
Endemic fauna of Madagascar
Mammals of Madagascar
Mammals described in 1869
Taxonomy articles created by Polbot
Taxa named by Alfred Grandidier
Taxobox binomials not recognized by IUCN